Jools Holland's Rhythm and Blues Orchestra (also known as Jools Holland and his Rhythm & Blues Orchestra) is a rhythm and blues band led by boogie-woogie pianist Jools Holland.

History 
Holland formed the band in 1994.  In May 2022 the 17-piece band consisted of piano, organ, drums, female vocals, electric guitar, bass guitar, alto saxophones, tenor saxophones, baritone saxophones, trumpets, and trombones.

Members 
Jools Holland — piano, guitar, vocals
Ruby Turner — vocals
Louise Marshall — vocals
Mabel Ray — vocals, backing vocals 
Gilson Lavis — drums, percussion
Mark Flanagan — guitar, backing vocals
Dave Swift — bass
Christopher Holland — organ, piano, backing vocals
Phil Veacock — saxophone, backing vocals
Michael 'Bammi' Rose — saxophone, backing vocals
Derek Nash — saxophone, backing vocals
Nick Lunt — baritone saxophone, backing vocals
Roger Goslyn — trombone, backing vocals
Fayyaz Virji — trombone, backing vocals
Winston Rollins — trombone, backing vocals
Jason McDermid — trumpet, backing vocals
Jon Scott — trumpet, backing vocals

References 

British rhythm and blues musical groups
Swing revival ensembles